Whitefish or white fish is a fisheries term for several species of demersal fish with fins, particularly Atlantic cod (Gadus morhua), whiting (Merluccius bilinearis), haddock (Melanogrammus aeglefinus), hake (Urophycis), pollock (Pollachius), and others. Whitefish (Coregonidae) is also the name of several species of Atlantic freshwater fish.

Whitefish live on or near the seafloor, and can be contrasted with the oily or pelagic fish which live away from the seafloor. Whitefish do not have much oil in their tissue, and have flakier white or light-coloured flesh. Most of the oil found in their bodies is concentrated in the organs, e.g. cod liver oil.

Whitefish can be divided into benthopelagic fish (round fish which live near the sea bed, such as cod and coley) and benthic fish (which live on the sea bed, such as flatfish like plaice).

Whitefish is sometimes eaten straight but is often used reconstituted for fishsticks, gefilte fish, lutefisk, surimi (imitation crab meat), etc.  For centuries it was preserved by drying as stockfish and clipfish and traded as a world commodity.  It is commonly used as the fish in the classic British dish of fish and chips.

Growth
The growth between Whitefish can be altered due to intraspecific competition. Fish populations such as Vendace and Roach share zooplankton for food which is crucial for young populations of whitefish. As this competition occurs, growth rate can be affected within multiple age groups or at an older age.

Nutritional information
One fillet of whitefish, mixed species (198g) contains the following nutritional information according to the United States Department of Agriculture:

See also
 Bottom feeder

References 

Fish common names
Fishing industry